The Chinese Ambassador to Estonia is the official representative of the People's Republic of China to Estonia.

List of representatives

See also
China–Estonia relations

References 

Ambassadors of China to Estonia
Estonia
China